The Brian Lara Cricket Academy is a multi-purpose stadium in Tarouba, San Fernando, Trinidad and Tobago, that was completed and inaugurated in 2017.  It will be used mostly for cricket matches.  It is located in southern Trinidad, just outside the heart of the city of San Fernando, beside the Sir Solomon Hochoy Highway, about two kilometres southeast of Trinidad and Tobago's former cricket ground at Guaracara Park, Pointe-a-Pierre.

Built to hold 15,000 people in a mix of fixed seating and grass banks it is named after former West Indies cricket captain Brian Lara, who until 17 October 2008 was the all-time leading run scorer in Test cricket, until he was surpassed by Sachin Tendulkar.

It was initially planned to host warm-up matches during the 2007 Cricket World Cup and serve as a cricket academy after the tournament.  However when it became apparent that the facility would not be completed in time for the tournament the warm-up matches were instead hosted at the Frank Worrell Field at UWI St Augustine.

The Caribbean Premier League chose the Brian Lara Cricket Academy as the host for the final matches of the 2017 tournament, the first high-profile matches at the ground. Subsequent to this the Government of Trinidad and Tobago further purchased the rights to hold the CPL finals from 2018 through to 2020 at the Brian Lara Cricket Academy.

Development 
The Brian Lara Cricket Academy was commissioned in 2004 by the Government of Trinidad and Tobago through the state company UDeCOTT to provide a high class sporting venue for the 2007 Cricket World Cup. With Trinidad and Tobago receiving the Brown Package of matches and the use of the Queens Park Oval as the primary venue, the Brian Lara facility was earmarked to host warm-up matches. To be ready for the Cricket World Cup the facility had to be completed by February 2007 and game ready by March 2007.

Major design and construction problems kept pushing back the completion date as well as increasing the construction cost. Once it became apparent it would not be ready for the World Cup, matches were shifted to the grounds at UWI. The delays and costs have made the complex one of the more controversial infrastructure projects undertaken in Trinidad and Tobago. The initial cost was estimated to be TT$257 million, but with the cost overruns and the increase in prices of materials, in 2009 the estimated costs were TT$700 million and by the time the facility was eventually opened in 2017 the costs had exceeded TT$1billion.

Other sports

It was designed by Hellmuth, Obata + Kassabaum, a US architectural firm. The complex was proposed to consist of:

 An aquatic centre with Olympic standard pools. This project was eventually moved and completed in Couva at the Ato Boldon Stadium.
 Olympic-sized velodrome, which was also constructed near the Ato Boldon Stadium in Couva.
 Indoor gymnasium. 
 School for training of athletes. 
 A large car park, new roads and other infrastructure works.

The completed stadium serves as a training facility for cricketers. It has four indoor cricket training pitches with computerised biometric technology to measure an athlete’s performance, including two full-length run-up pitches for fast bowlers. Spectators have an unhindered view from every area of the stadium, including the concessionaires area. It also has areas specifically designed for the print, radio and television media.

The facility may also include a hotel in the future. It has been estimated to cost an additional TT$190 million.

Cricket matches
The first major cricket matches at the ground were several of the matches of the Caribbean Premier League in September 2017, including the final. The first first-class match was held in November 2017: in 2017-18 and 2018–19 the Trinidad and Tobago team played some of its home matches in the Regional Four Day Competition there, and some at Queen's Park Oval in Port of Spain.

References

External links
 Brian Lara Stadium at Cricinfo
 Brian Lara Stadium at CricketArchive

Stadium
Cricket grounds in Trinidad and Tobago
Multi-purpose stadiums in Trinidad and Tobago
Sports venues completed in 2008